In Greek and Roman mythology, Achates (Ancient Greek: Ἀχάτης) may refer to the following personages: 
Achates, a companion of the exiled Aeneas.
 Achates, a Sicilian who came to Aristaeus in order to join Dionysus in his Indian campaign.

Notes

References 

 Nonnus of Panopolis, Dionysiaca translated by William Henry Denham Rouse (1863-1950), from the Loeb Classical Library, Cambridge, MA, Harvard University Press, 1940.  Online version at the Topos Text Project.
 Nonnus of Panopolis, Dionysiaca. 3 Vols. W.H.D. Rouse. Cambridge, MA., Harvard University Press; London, William Heinemann, Ltd. 1940-1942. Greek text available at the Perseus Digital Library.
 Publius Ovidius Naso, Fasti translated by James G. Frazer. Online version at the Topos Text Project.
 Publius Ovidius Naso, Fasti. Sir James George Frazer. London; Cambridge, MA. William Heinemann Ltd.; Harvard University Press. 1933. Latin text available at the Perseus Digital Library.
 Publius Vergilius Maro, Aeneid. Theodore C. Williams. trans. Boston. Houghton Mifflin Co. 1910. Online version at the Perseus Digital Library.
 Publius Vergilius Maro, Bucolics, Aeneid, and Georgics. J. B. Greenough. Boston. Ginn & Co. 1900. Latin text available at the Perseus Digital Library.

Dionysus in mythology
Sicilian characters in Greek mythology